Tech3 is a motorcycle racing team competing in the MotoGP class World Championship under the name Tech3 GasGas Factory Racing. They also compete in the Moto3 World Championship under the name Red Bull KTM Tech3 and the MotoE World Cup under the name Tech3 E-Racing.

History

The team was founded in 1990 by ex-racer Hervé Poncharal, engineer Guy Coulon and Bernard Martignac, and began racing in the 250 cc class using Honda and Suzuki motorcycles.

In 1999, the team partnered with Yamaha for the factory team and in 2000 their riders, Olivier Jacque and Shinya Nakano, placed first and second in the 250 world championship. In 2001 the team moved the whole operation to the premier class, again with Yamaha, Jacque and Nakano on the YZR500, though their status changed to that of satellite team through to the present. Towards the end of the 2002 season, the team was given use of the YZR-M1.

In 2006 and 2007 the team used Dunlop tyres, but returned to Michelin in 2008. In the 2008 Grand Prix motorcycle racing season, the two-time and reigning Superbike World Champion James Toseland partnered with the two-time Superbike World Champion Colin Edwards. For 2010, Ben Spies replaced Toseland. Spies finished the season in sixth place while Edwards finished in eleventh place. In the new Moto2 category, Tech3 rider Yuki Takahashi finished the season in twelfth place while Raffaele De Rosa finished 27th, aboard Honda-powered bikes using a Tech3 chassis. For 2011, Spies moved to the factory Yamaha team, and was being replaced by Cal Crutchlow; the team again retained Colin Edwards for a fourth season. For 2012, Crutchlow moved into the second year of his two-year deal, while Edwards announced that he was leaving for the Forward Racing team with Andrea Dovizioso having been confirmed as his replacement. Bradley Smith signed a deal to ride for the team in MotoGP in 2013 and 2014.

In early 2018, after twenty years' association with Yamaha, the team made a shock announcement to make an intended move to KTM beginning in the 2019 season, becoming a satellite team to the Austrian firm's MotoGP presence. The Tech3 squad are considered as a 'junior' or development team, signing upcoming riders early in their MotoGP class careers.

In mid-2018, Tech3 also confirmed they would be entering the inaugural season of the MotoE World Cup in 2019.

After the 2019 season in Moto2, with KTM withdrawing from the series, for 2020 Tech3 will field a two-rider team in the Moto3 class for the first time, also using KTM machinery.

In the 2020 season Tech3 recorded their first ever premier-class win in their 373rd start at the Styrian Grand Prix in Austria, KTM's home event. The race was won by Miguel Oliveira. Rider and team repeated the feat at the final race of the season in Portugal, Oliviera's home race.

Grand Prix motorcycle results

By rider

By year

(key) (Races in bold indicate pole position; races in italics indicate fastest lap)

* Season still in progress.

See also
:Category:Tech3 MotoGP riders

Notes

References

External links
 https://www.teamtech3.fr/

Motorcycle racing teams
Motorcycle racing teams established in 1990
1990 establishments in France
Dakar rally racing teams